Justin Casquejo is an American free solo climber and stunt performer who has scaled several skyscrapers in Manhattan, New York City, as well as a water tower in his hometown, Weehawken, New Jersey. He has been arrested, charged, and convicted for some of his activities. Others have been brought to light through his publication on social media, such as Instagram and YouTube.

One World Trade Center
In March 2014, Casquejo climbed to the top of the topped-out, but not yet completed,  One World Trade Center. Casquejo, then 16 years old, entered the site through a hole in a fence. He was subsequently arrested on trespassing charges. He allegedly dressed like a construction worker, snuck in, and convinced an elevator operator to lift him to the tower's 88th floor, according to news sources. He then used stairways to get to the 104th floor, walked past a sleeping security guard, and climbed up a ladder to get to the antenna, where he took pictures for two hours. The elevator operator was reassigned, and the guard was fired. It was then revealed that officials had failed to install security cameras in the tower, which facilitated Casquejo's entry to the site.

In July 2014, in a plea agreement, Casquejo admitted to breaking a city misdemeanor law against scaling tall buildings without permission. He was sentenced to 23 days of service (which he completed with an extra six days). He submitted, as was required, a 1,200-word essay explaining what he had learned from the episode.

Weehawken Water Tower
In September 2014, Casquejo was again arrested for scaling the  Weehawken Water Tower. He was charged with defiant trespassing and resisting arrest.

70 Pine Street
He avoided jail time in the sentencing on September 6, 2017, after pleading guilty to BASE jumping. He was granted youthful offender status; the case will eventually be sealed.

Paramount Tower
In June 2017, Casquejo was arrested at the  Paramount, a 52-story residential skyscraper on East 39th Street in Turtle Bay, Manhattan. In September 2017 Casquejo pleaded guilty to second-degree trespass in exchange for three years' probation for scaling the luxury apartment building.

Unapprehended climbs
In addition to those situations where he has been apprehended, Casquejo has posted images of climbing the George Washington Bridge and buildings near Times Square, Columbus Circle, and the Empire State Building. He has a large following on Instagram and YouTube.

220 Central Park South
In November 2016 Casquejo hung from a construction crane at the not-yet-completed  220 Central Park South.

Other climbs and arrests
Despite his probation Casquejo made other climbs. for which he was arrested.

See also
BASE jumping

References

External links 

1998 births
Living people
American stunt performers
People from Weehawken, New Jersey